
Gmina Pszczółki is a rural gmina (administrative district) in Gdańsk County, Pomeranian Voivodeship, in northern Poland.

Villages
Gmina Pszczółki contains the villages and settlements of Kleszczewko, Kolnik, Ostrowite, Pszczółki, Rębielcz, Różyny, Skowarcz, Skowarcz-Kolonia, Ulkowy and Żelisławki.

Neighbouring gminas
Gmina Pszczółki is bordered by the gminas of Pruszcz Gdański, Suchy Dąb, Tczew and Trąbki Wielkie.

References
   
Polish official population figures 2006

Pszczolki
Gdańsk County